Hui of Balhae (died 817) (r. 812?–817) was the eighth king of Balhae.  He was the son of King Gang, and the younger brother of King Jeong. He actively cultivated relations with Tang China, and imported many aspects of Tang culture and governmental systems, and sent buddhist statues to  Tang China in 814.He married and had a son named Dae Yeon-jun. The king used jujak(朱雀)  as his yeonho.

See also
List of Korean monarchs
History of Korea

References

817 deaths
Balhae rulers
Mohe peoples
9th-century rulers in Asia
Year of birth uncertain